is a Japanese manga artist, who also writes as . She writes in a variety of demographics, publishing yaoi manga as Sumomo Yumeka and seinen manga as Mizu Sahara  She is best known in the west for The Day I Became a Butterfly and Same Cell Organism, both under the Yumeka byline, and the manga adaptation of Voices of a Distant Star under Mizu Sahara. Her series My Girl is being adapted as a live-action television series which began broadcasting in October 2009.

Works

As Sumomo Yumeka
 Kokoro Kikai
 Soshite Hibi Koishiteku
 Soshite Koi ga Hajimaru by Kei Tsukimura (illustrator only)
 Natsukashi Machi no Rozione
 Dousabou Seibutsu (published in English by Digital Manga Publishing as Same Cell Organism)
 Chou ni Naru Hi (published in English by Digital Manga Publishing as The Day I Became a Butterfly)
 Tengusin (published in English by Aurora Publishing as Tengu-Jin)
 Nemunoki no Geshukusou
 Kon no Ki Konoha
 Kimi wa Boku no Taiyou
 Hate ni Aru Kimi
 Kaze Shinshutsu Shita
 The Snake and the Boy (Mitoshōnen)
 Boku wa Sakana

As Mizu Sahara
 Basu Hashiru (includes a series of shorts under the title Nanairo Sekai)
 My Girl
 Hoshi no Koe (written by Makoto Shinkai, illustrator only, published in English by Tokyopop as Voices of a Distant Star)
 Kumo no Mukou, Yakusoku no Basho (written Makoto Shinkai, illustrator only)
 Watashitachi no Shiawase na Jikan (adaption of novel by Ji-Young Gong)
 Tetsugaku Retora
 Itsuya-san

References

External links
 Sumomo Yumeka, Mizu Sahara manga at Media Arts Database 
 Unofficial Website
 

Manga artists
Living people
Japanese female comics artists
Women manga artists
Female comics writers
Japanese women writers
Year of birth missing (living people)